
Gliwice County is a unit of territorial administration and local government (powiat) in Silesian Voivodeship, southern Poland. It came into being on January 1, 1999, as a result of the Polish local government reforms passed in 1998. Its administrative seat is the city of Gliwice, although the city is not part of the county (it constitutes a separate city county).

As of 2019 its total population is 115,571. The most populated towns are Knurów with 38,310 inhabitants and Pyskowice with 18,432 inhabitants.

Neighbouring counties
Apart from the city of Gliwice, Gliwice County is also bordered by Tarnowskie Góry County to the north-east, the city of Zabrze to the east, Mikołów County and the city of Ruda Śląska to the south-east, Rybnik County and the city of Rybnik to the south, Racibórz County to the south-west, Kędzierzyn-Koźle County to the west, and Strzelce County to the north-west.

Administrative division
The county is subdivided into eight gminas (two urban, two urban-rural and four rural). These are listed in the following table, in descending order of population.

References

 
Gliwice